The Gotham Independent Film Award for Breakthrough Series – Short Form is one of the annual Gotham Independent Film Awards and honors series with episodes under 40 minutes. Until 2019, the award intended to honor a new continuing or limited series new digital media programming, with five or more episodes mostly under 20 minutes. It was first awarded in 2015.

Winners and nominees

2010s

2020s

References

External links
 

Breakthrough Series - Short Form
Awards established in 2015
2015 establishments in the United States